Alkali Lake may refer to:

A soda lake or "alkaline lake" (a lake with high alkalinity)

In Canada 
 Alkali Lake, British Columbia
 Alkali Lake Indian Band, First Nations government of the Secwepemc (Shuswap) people in British Columbia

In the United States 
 Alkali Lakes, playas in northeastern California
 Alkali Lake Chemical Waste Dump, hazardous waste disposal site in Oregon
 Alkali Lake, a playa in Oregon
 Alkali Lake State Airport, airport in Oregon
 Alkali Lake in Blaine County, Montana
 Alkali Lake in Lincoln County, Montana
 Alkali Lake in Glacier County, Montana
 Alkali Lake in Meagher County, Montana
 Alkali Lake in Pondera County, Montana
 Alkali Lake in Toole County, Montana
 Alkali Lake (Lander and Pershing counties, Nevada), a lake in Nevada

In fiction
 Alkali Lake, a fictional location in the X-Men universe, portrayed in films using the real-life Barrier Lake